Yiwu County as the official romanized name, also transliterated from Uyghur as Aratürük County, is a county in the northeast of the Xinjiang Uyghur Autonomous Region and is under the administration of the Hami City. According to the 2002 census, it has a population of 20,000.

Yiwu was the site of the final battle in mainland China of the Chinese Civil War. There is a monument in Yiwu to a horse who greatly aided the People's Liberation Army during the battle.

Demographics

Geography
The Yiwu County is located in the northeastern part of the prefecture, between the Qarliq Shan mountain range (along which it borders on Hami City) and the border with Mongolia's Govi-Altai Province. Outside of the mountain range, most of the county is within the Gobi Desert.

Some of the county important populated places are located in the oases irrigated by the intermittent Yiwu River, which flows north from the mountains, eventually disappearing in the desert. These include, from south to north, Yiwu Town (the county seat), Weizi Xia Township and Laomao Hu Town.

As of the 1920s, the area of today's Yiwu town was referred to as "Tuhulu" and that name is still retained by the Tuhulu Township adjacent to today's Yiwu town. At the time, it was the first place with an actual river and some agriculture that weary travellers from the east would reach after crossing several hundreds of kilometers of desert (since crossing Edsin Gol, a River in Inner Mongolia).

Other places in the county include Qianshan Kazakh Township, Yanchi Township and Xiamaya Township.

Climate

References

County-level divisions of Xinjiang
Hami